Richard Shepherd (born Richard Allen Silberman; June 4, 1927 – January 14, 2014) was an American film producer.

Biography 

Born Richard Allen Silberman in 1927 in Kansas City, Missouri, he attended Stanford University and studied journalism. After graduating, he worked for talent agent Lew Wasserman at MCA, selling syndicated TV shows. In the early 1950s, Jews were somewhat ostracized where he worked, and he changed his name to Shepherd, according to his son Scott. During his employment with MCA, Shepherd enlisted in the United States Army, writing stories for the Stars and Stripes newspaper in post-World War II Germany.

After leaving MCA, he formed Jurow-Shepherd Productions with Martin Jurow.  Their first picture together was The Hanging Tree starring Gary Cooper and Maria Schell which they followed with The Fugitive Kind, an adaptation of Tennessee Williams's Orpheus Descending, starring Marlon Brando and Anna Magnani.

They signed a six-picture deal with Paramount Pictures where they made films including an adaptation of Truman Capote's Breakfast at Tiffany’s. When Paramount Pictures wanted to replace the signature song "Moon River," both Shepherd and Jurow exclaimed "Over our dead bodies!" The song later won the Academy Award for Best Original Song.

He became an agent again in the 1960s, becoming one of the first partners at Creative Management Associates. He would go on to head production at Warner Bros. in 1970 and MGM in 1976 and later founded his own agency, the Artists Agency, where he would work into his 70s.

Personal life and death
Shepherd was married from 1954 to 1978 to Judith Mayer Goetz, daughter of film producer William Goetz and granddaughter of Louis B. Mayer. They had three children, Scott, Tony, and Victoria. In 1979, Shepherd married Patricia and had a son, Christopher, by her.

Shepherd died at his home in Los Angeles at the age of 86, from kidney failure.

Filmography
He was a producer in all films unless otherwise noted.

Film

Production manager

Miscellaneous crew

Television

As writer

References

External links

 Shepherd discussing Breakfast at Tiffany's (YouTube video)

1927 births
2014 deaths
Talent agents
Film producers from Missouri
American film producers
American film studio executives
Metro-Goldwyn-Mayer executives
Warner Bros. people
20th-century American Jews
American male journalists
Businesspeople from Kansas City, Missouri
Stanford University alumni
United States Army soldiers
Deaths from kidney failure
20th-century American businesspeople
21st-century American Jews